Minoia is an Italian surname. Notable people with the surname include:

Alberto Minoia (born 1960), Italian footballer
Ferdinando Minoia (1884–1940), Italian racing driver

Italian-language surnames